The list of provincial parks of the British Columbia Northern Interior contains the provincial parks located within this geographic region of the province of British Columbia. It includes parks from the three regional districts of Northern Rockies, Peace River and Stikine. These parks are administered by BC Parks under the jurisdiction of the Ministry of Environment and Climate Change Strategy.

List of parks

External links 

Map of provincial parks in the Northern Interior on env.gov.bc.ca

 
Provincial parks
British Columbia, Northern Interior
Provincial parks